Pouteria rhynchocarpa is a species of plant in the family Sapotaceae. It is endemic to Veracruz state in eastern Mexico.

References

rhynchocarpa
Endemic flora of Mexico
Flora of Veracruz
Endangered biota of Mexico
Endangered plants
Taxonomy articles created by Polbot